Thomas E. Anderson (born August 28, 1961) is an American computer scientist noted for his research on distributed computing, networking and operating systems.

Biography
Anderson received a B.A. in Philosophy  from Harvard University in 1983. He received a M.S. in computer science from University of Washington in 1989 and a Ph.D in computer science from  University of Washington in 1991.

He then joined the Department of Computer Science at the University of California, Berkeley as an assistant professor in 1991. While there he was promoted to associate professor in 1996. In 1997, he moved to the  University of Washington as an associate professor. In 2001, he was promoted to professor, and in 2009 to the Robert E. Dinning Professor in Computer Science. He currently holds the Warren Francis and Wilma Kolm Bradley Endowed Chair.

Awards
His notable awards include:

 ACM SIGOPS Mark Weiser Award in 2005
 ACM Fellow in 2005 
 IEEE Koji Kobayashi Computers and Communications Award, 2013
 USENIX Lifetime Achievement Award, 2014
 National Academy of Engineering, 2016, for “contributions to the design of resilient and efficient distributed computer systems.”

Works

References

External links
 University of Washington web page: Thomas E. Anderson, Department of Computer Science

American computer scientists
University of Washington faculty
UC Berkeley College of Engineering faculty
ACM
Living people
Harvard College alumni
University of Washington alumni
1961 births
People from Orlando, Florida
Scientists from Florida
Members of the United States National Academy of Engineering